Ellesmere College is a private co-educational boarding and day school  located in Shropshire, near the market town of Ellesmere. Belonging to the Woodard Corporation, it was founded in 1884 by Canon Nathaniel Woodard.

The Woodard Corporation is a significant charity. Today, Woodard educates over 30,000 pupils across academy, private, and state-maintained schools.

The College consists of a Lower School (Years 3-8), a Middle School (Years 9-11) and a Sixth Form (Year 12-13) where students can choose their own A-Level, BTEC, and  International Baccalaureate subjects.

History 
The College was founded in 1879 by Canon Nathaniel Woodard as a boys' school in association with the Church of England, with the 114-acre (460,000 m2) land being provided by Lord Brownlow. Originally called St. Oswald's School, the building was designed by Richard Carpenter and Benjamin Ingelow, and the College opened on 5 August 1884 with 70 boys and four masters. The College-based itself on Anglo-Catholic values within a traditional public school framework, with the aim of providing education at a low cost for the sons of families with limited finances.

Despite the school's Christian foundation, there was no permanent chapel until 1926, and a temporary chapel operated in the crypt beneath the dining hall. In 1926, an official chapel was designed by Sir Aston Webb, but only the first portion was built in 1928. Modified plans were then drawn up in 1932 by Sir Charles Nicholson, and the building was completed in 1959. Unfortunately, the newly completed chapel and dining hall were then destroyed by a fire in 1966. They were both reopened in 1969, and building work continued at the College throughout the 1970s, including new classrooms and additional boarding accommodation.

During World War II, the College stored a number of notable paintings from the Walker Art Gallery including Dante's Dream. Additionally, in 1978, the College became the location for the filming of Absolution, starring Richard Burton and was also the first film role for Billy Connolly, though the chapel scenes were filmed at Pinewood and Bradfield College.

Since 1980, the College has been home to a Schulze Organ, originally installed at St Mary's Parish Church, Tyne Dock.

Coat of Arms 

Arms were granted to "Saint Mary and Saint Nicholas Corporation Trustee" for the use of Ellesmere College on 12 April 1954, the cost of the grant being met by the Old Boys' Association. The grant is kept displayed in a case fastened to the wall of ante-chapel.

The blazon (heraldic description) means that the shield is divided per chevron, the upper part being purple (Purpure) and the lower part being gold (Or). The Celestial Crowns have eight points, five of which are conventionally shown in the illustration and each end in a star. They are "of the last" tincture mentioned, that is, gold, and are horizontally arranged (fesswise). At the top of the shield (In Chief), is a golden cross with each limb ending in a fleur-de-lis (Flory), and at the base of the shield is a raven in its natural colours (Proper) holding a golden ring (Annulet) in its beak. The wreath is the conventional representation of the twisted band of material that is the principal metal and colour of the shield, in this case, gold and purple, which was worn around the helmet and helped to bind the crest mantling to it. The mantling represents the cloth worn over the back of the helmet and body-armour to prevent overheating by the sun. The crest is a raven, as in the Arms, standing on a grassy mound.

The shield, crest and motto are all connected to the saintly King Oswald, to whom the School is dedicated and who fought a battle at nearby Oswestry. The Celestial Crowns represent Oswald's kingship and the heavenly crown gained by him; the cross stands for the cross which the king raised before his victory against the heathen Penda of Mercia at Heavenfield, ans for Oswald's saintly life. Purple and gold are royal colours, and the raven directly refers to the legend concerning Oswald's coronation, when the chrismatory was accidentally broken and a raven miraculously appeared with new oil, bearing in its beak a letter containing the assurance that the oil had been consecrated by St. Peter himself. The ring in the raven's beak refers to the story of Oswald sending the bird to a heathen princess whom he wished to convert and marry. This emblem is also used by the College Scout Group (by permission of the Headmaster and the Headquarters of the Boy Scouts' Association' as the Group emblem which is embroidered in black on the points of their scarves which are yellow bordered with purple. The motto, which may be translated as "Striving for One's Country", can also refer to Oswald's struggle to maintain the independence of Northumbria against heathen aggression. The motto was likely chosen by the School's first Custos, Sir Offley Wakeman.

Ellesmere College Lower School

Key Stage 2 
The academic curriculum for Key Stage 2 reflects the National Curriculum, but is wider in scope in order to prepare pupils for GCSE, A-Level and the International Baccalaureate. All subjects are taught by subject specialist teachers, and there are teaching assistants in the younger classes in order to more readily meet the needs of the individual learner.

Pupils are assessed at the beginning of the academic year, and targets are consistently set. Each pupil is tracked regularly through in-class assessments in English, Mathematics and Science. Thus, at the end of Year 6, pupils have a smooth and seamless transition into Year 7.

Key Stage 3 
During Key Stage 3 (Ages 11–13), classes continue to be taught by subject specialists and the students' form tutor provides pastoral care and monitors progress regularly. Progress and effort attainment grades (period grades) are reported twice a term, and reflect progress in each topic. Parents are reported to every term through a parents' meeting or a written report, and regular assessment alongside clear communication ensures that progress is closely monitored and appropriate targets are set.

Ellesmere College Middle School 
The curriculum is streamlined from Year 9 to Year 10 with the focus placed upon courses leading to GCSE. All pupils study the core subjects of the National Curriculum: English, Mathematics, Sciences, and a range of chosen subjects. The College puts a strong emphasis on serving the individual, and strives for each pupil to achieve the best results of which they are capable of. Whilst not bound by the constraints of the National Curriculum, English and Mathematics are compulsory subjects to KS4 and a Modern Foreign Language is also urged alongside a form of Technology and/or Art. Additionally, all pupils follow a non-examinable course in Physical Education whilst PHSE and Careers Education is provided via the tutor system.

Ellesmere College Sixth Form 
The Sixth Form offers full-time courses for over 200 students which includes the International Baccalaureate Diploma and the BTEC Level 3 National Diploma in Sport, as well as A-Levels. Recently, students have been performing to a high standard and have ensured that the College is noted both nationally and internationally for its achievements. University entrance sees over 85% of students gaining their first choice place in a range of universities and courses including Oxford, Cambridge, and Russell Group Institutions.

A-Levels 
Ellesmere College's A-Level courses lead to university entry and/or can provide the specialist qualification for direct entry into work. It is expected that students will choose 3 A-Level subjects, and there are two termly reviews which support students and guides their performance and career aspirations.

International Baccalaureate 
Students undertaking the IB Diploma Programme are required to study six subjects; three at Higher Level and three at Standard Level. These subjects typically include a mix of Language & Literature, Sciences, Mathematics, Humanities, Arts, and a range of other elective subjects alongside a second language. In addition to the aforementioned, there are three more obligatory components: an Extended Essay, Theory of Knowledge and Creativity Activity Service (CAS).

BTEC National Diploma 
Ellesmere College provides an alternative to A-Level P.E. with the BTEC National Diploma and Extended Diploma in Sport, which is an applied general qualification which is equivalent to two A-Levels. It has been designed as part of a two-year programme ideal for students who wish to pursue a course that specialises in sport, health and fitness, and can also be combined with one other A-Level.

Music at Ellesmere 

Ellesmere College offers GCSE Music, AS and A2 Music Technology (following the Edexcel syllabus) and International Baccalaureate Music as options for students in Years 10–13. These courses seek to develop students as performers, composers and appraisers. All three skills are intertwined and afforded equal importance, and students study music theory and notation throughout their time at the College in order to have a solid base from which to build on their skills. Ellesmere College recently celebrated success after being named the winners in the Education Business Award for Music 2018.

Ellesmere College's instrumental teaching staff currently teaches over 120 students on a wide range of instruments including voice, piano, organ, guitar, drums, strings, harp, woodwind, and brass. Ellesmere College hosts the Associated Board for exam sessions termly, meaning students can take their exams in familiar surroundings. The instrumental lessons can be arranged by the Director of Music.

Singing is an area of real excellence, and students are given the opportunity to participate in four possible choirs; all of whom rehearse and perform regularly. This approach ensures a sufficient challenge for all students and provides a thorough preparation for choral scholarships at University. There are also a wide range of instrumental ensembles available such as the Lower School Band, Clarinet Quartet, Saxophone Quartet, Flute Choir, Tom-Tom Club, and lower strings ensemble.

Drama 

There are numerous drama projects in rehearsal and production every term at Ellesmere. Some are pupil directed, and use groups of students in 'playwright' productions such as the annual House Play Festival. There are also weekly drama clubs provided throughout the year, and specific year groups are all given the opportunity to perform.

The Senior School Play performed in the Easter Term is open to all pupils in Year 11 and Sixth Form, and either a musical or two direct productions are performed biannually (one of which is taken on tour to the U.S.A.). As part of the drama course, there are frequent visits to professional theatres, but there is also a termly 'open' theatre trip available for all Sixth Form students.

Year 9 and 10 have a regular Shakespeare slot, and often participate in the Shakespeare Schools Festival. They also perform frequently and attend workshops at professional theatres. The GCSE Drama and AS/A-Level Drama & Theatre studies courses, alongside the International Baccalaureate Theatre Arts course, produce end-of-year shows in which the high quality of their performance work is demonstrated for examination purposes.

A selection of students from the Year 9-13 year groups are given the opportunity to visit the Tabor Academy in Massachusetts as part of their Easter break, following the successful visit of the Academy to the College where they performed their production 'Lucky Me', which was impressively written, produced and acted by students of the Academy.

The studio theatre is run by a professional theatre technician who works in conjunction with a pupil stage crew who learn to light, stage manage and run complex shows as a tightly knit team of hard-working technicians. Script writing competitions are open to the students on an annual basis, and our most gifted students are encouraged towards summer schools of excellence, such as the National Youth Theatre.

Combined Cadet Force (CCF) 

The Combined Cadet Force (CCF) within Ellesmere College comprises three sections (Royal Navy, British Army and Royal Air Force), and is led under the overall command of Lt. Col. M.P. Clewlow.

During term time, CCF training takes place on a Thursday afternoon with all three sections offering a variety of activities to the cadets. These activities enable them to acquire useful life skills, develop their leadership and management capabilities and use their initiative in unfamiliar and challenging environments. Camps and courses throughout the year enable cadets to build upon this weekly training, enabling the consolidation of the many skills learnt in different Ministry of Defence establishments and training facilities across the UK.

Expeditions 
The popularity of the outdoor pursuit programmes at the College leads naturally to a programme of expeditions both within the United Kingdom and beyond. Recent overseas expeditions have included canoeing in France, alongside treks in Guyana and the High Atlas Mountains in Morocco and Ecuador.

Duke of Edinburgh Award 
Cadets have the opportunity to pursue the Duke of Edinburgh Award scheme (Bronze, Silver and Gold) through the CCF via a dedicated adventurous training camp at Easter.

 Volunteering
 Physical  
 Skills 
 Expedition

There is an additional fifth Residential section at Gold Level.

Pastoral Care 

Day pupils and boarders alike benefit from a team of tutors and a 'housemother' who are all marshalled by a Housemaster or a Housemistress. Each pupil is provided with a personal tutor whilst in Lower School, and this role is taken by the form teacher.

All pupils are required to attend Chapel services that take place during the school days. Where services are shown in the calendar as weekend attendance, it is compulsory for pupils resident in College at that time to attend, but voluntary for others. However, attendance at Confirmation Services is voluntary for all.

Boarding 
The school has seven boarding houses which mostly have single and twin rooms, but there are also some larger multi-bedded rooms available.

St. Cuthbert's & St. Patrick's - Boys - Ages 13-16 
There are two boarding houses dedicated to Middle School boys; St. Cuthbert's and St. Patrick's.

St. Aidan's - Girls - Ages 13-16 
St. Aidan's is a boarding house for Middle School girls.

St. Bede's & St. Luke's - Boys - Ages 16-18 
There are two Sixth Form boys boarding houses; St. Bede's and St. Luke's.

St. Oswald's & St. Hilda's - Girls - Ages 16-18 
St. Oswald's & St. Hilda's are both Sixth Form girls boarding houses.

Sports Academies 
Ellesmere College has seven different academies to help young players achieve their full potential, and many who have joined Ellesmere College's academies have gone on to represent their county and country.

Scholarships & Bursaries 
Ellesmere College has a long tradition of recognising talent and supporting students for whom the full fees would prove a barrier to entry. As a result, a wide variety of scholarships, exhibitions and awards are available, plus means-tested bursaries can be offered to further supplement these awards.

Scholarships

Academic Award 
Scholarships and Exhibitions are awarded each year as a result of a candidate's performance in examinations across a range of academic subjects; the examination may be supplemented by an interview and other assessment methods. These awards are worth up to a maximum of 50% of the school fees.

An academic scholar will be of a standard that would lead to As & A*s or Level 8 and 9 equivalent at GCSE.

The Ellesmerian 
The Ellesmerian is an annual magazine that details all of the activity at the College throughout the academic year. It contains the following reports:

 Headmaster's Summary
 Prize Winners
 Common Room Arrivals/Departures 
 Chapel Notes
 Competitive House Reports
 Lower School/Middle School/Sixth Form Reports
 University Destinations
 CCF/DofE Reports
 Arts Summaries (including Music, Drama, Art, Design & Technology, Dance...) 
 News Stories
 Charity Work 
 Parents' Society Report 
 Old Ellesmerian Updates 
 Sports Reports from Every Term 
 Sports Academy Reports

The Ellesmerian is available digitally and by print.

Sport 
Ellesmere College has been recognised as an Athlete Friendly Education Centre (AFEC) by the World Academy of Sport (WAoS) in recognition of the way it helps student-athletes on the International Baccalaureate course balance sport and education as they follow an athletic pathway concurrently with their studies. Ellesmere College is one of only 22 schools in the world to receive this accreditation.

Student numbers
Total number of pupils: 550; age range: 7–18
 Number of boys: 362
 Number of girls: 187
 Number of boarders: 162
 Number in 6th form: 192

Headmasters 

 J. Bullock (1884 - 1890) 
 J. Harrison (1890 - 1894) 
 J. Beviss Thompson (1894 - 1903) 
 E. Illiff Robson (1903 - 1907) 
 H. Woolsey (1907 - 1910) 
 T.H. Hedworth (1910 - 1927) 
 A.V. Billen (1927 - 1935) 
 R.A. Evans-Prosser (1935 - 1961) 
 I.D.S. Beer (1961 - 1969) 
 D.J. Skipper (1969 - 1982) 
 F.E. Maidment (1982 - 1988) 
 D.R. Du Cros (1988 - 1996) 
 B.J. Wignall (1996–Present)

Ellesmere College's current headmaster, Mr. Brendan Wignall, has been recognised in National Awards, has been named one of the UK's best leaders of a public school, and was shortlisted in the best Headmaster category at the Tatler School Awards 2017.

Notable Old Ellesmerians

Former pupils of Ellesmere College are referred to as "Old Ellesmerians".
 Martin Aitchison – Illustrator of over 70 Ladybird Books
 Freya Anderson, freestyle swimmer and Olympic gold medalist
 Sir Bill Beaumont – Chair of World Rugby and Captain of the British Lions
 Ralph Benjamin – CB, NATO and member of Defence Scientific Advisory Council 
 John Brunt – World War II recipient of the Victoria Cross
 Michael Chapman – Archdeacon of Northampton
 Harry Craig - Younger Brother of British Actor Daniel Craig, and the first student from the school to be accepted into the National Youth Theatre
 Noel Davies – Chief Executive of Vickers Shipbuilding & Engineering Ltd
 Paul Dean, Baron Dean of Harptree – Conservative Member of Parliament 
 Peter Gilbert – UK Field Hospital in Camp Bastion, Afghanistan, Deputy Lieutenant of Kent
 Robert Godwin – author
 Lady Edwina Grosvenor – prison reformer and founder of The Clink Restaurants
 Hugh Grosvenor - 7th Duke of Westminster
 Frederick Harvey – Ireland rugby player and World War I recipient of the Victoria Cross
 Chris Hawkins – DJ, television and radio presenter and reporter
 David Henderson – Chief Economist, OECD.
 Guy Home – Cricketer
 Michael Howard – Musician
 Peter Jones – actor, broadcaster and screenwriter
 Elfric Wells Chalmers Kearney – Australian inventor and railway engineer
 Mark Keyworth – rugby player
 James King – rugby player
 Dave Manby – slalom canoeist
 Peter McEnery – actor
 Chris Moncrieff – journalist
 Grenville Morris – footballer
 Marty Natalegawa – Indonesian Minister of Foreign Affairs
 David Nicholls – Commander British Forces, Falkland Islands/South Atlantic Islands
 Bryan Oates – film editor who worked on The Killing Fields, The Mission and Roger Rabbit
 Dewi Penrhyn Jones – professional cricketer
 Reginald Ryder – professional cricketer
 Frank Swindell – Archdeacon of Singapore 
 Huw Thomas – broadcaster, ITN newscaster, barrister and Liberal Party politician
 Harry Herbert Trusted – British Colonial Attorney-General and Chief Justice

References

External links
 Ellesmere College website
 Old Ellesmerian Club
 The Woodard Corporation of Schools
 Ellesmere College Titans
 360° Virtual tour of Ellesmere College

Anglo-Catholic educational establishments
Educational institutions established in 1884
Private schools in Shropshire
Woodard Schools
Member schools of the Headmasters' and Headmistresses' Conference
Boarding schools in Shropshire
International Baccalaureate schools in England
 
1884 establishments in England
Church of England private schools in the Diocese of Hereford